Pseudococcus maritimus, the grape mealybug, is a scale insect species in the genus Pseudococcus infecting grapevines. It is also a vector of little cherry disease.

The larvae of the moth Coccidiphila gerasimovi feed on the eggs of Coccidae species, including P. maritimus.

References

Insects described in 1900
Grape pest insects
Insect vectors of plant pathogens
Hemiptera of Europe
Pseudococcidae